Samuel Clarke (July 29, 1853 – July 8, 1928) was a Canadian merchant and political figure. He represented Northumberland West in the Legislative Assembly of Ontario from 1898 to 1926 as a Liberal member.

He was born in Brampton, Canada West, the son of Thomas Clarke. He was mayor of Cobourg from 1887 to 1890 .

He died on July 8, 1928.

References 

 Canadian Parliamentary Guide, 1916, EJ Chambers

External links 

1853 births
1928 deaths
Mayors of Cobourg
Ontario Liberal Party MPPs